Anna Proletářka is a 1953 Czechoslovak film based on the novel by Ivan Olbracht.  The movie was filmed on location in Osek, and Prague. It was released on 20 February 1953. It describes proletarian life in the newly-independent Czechoslovakia after World War I.

Cast
 Marie Tomášová as Anna
 Josef Bek as Tonik
 Jana Dítětová as Mana
 Borivoj Kristek as Bohous
 Bedřich Karen as Rubes
 Jarmila Májová as Rubesova
 Libuse Pospísilová as Dadla
 Oldřich Velen as Dr. Houra
 Vítezslav Vejrazka as Jandak
 Sasa Lichy as Jarous
 Martin Růžek as Podhradsky
 František Vnouček as Tusar
 Karel Máj as Habrman
 Theodor Pištěk as Nemec

References

External links
 

1953 films
1950s Czech-language films
Czechoslovak black-and-white films
Czech black-and-white films
1953 drama films
Films directed by Karel Steklý
Czechoslovak drama films
1950s Czech films